Jalan Gunung Jerai, Federal Route 252 (formerly Kedah state route K159), is a federal road in Mount Jerai, Kedah, Malaysia. It is a main route to Mount Jerai. The Kilometre Zero is at Guar Chempedak.

Features
At most sections, the Federal Route 252 was built under the JKR R5 road standard, allowing maximum speed limit of up to 90 km/h.

List of junctions

References

Malaysian Federal Roads